Mount Scopus ("Mount of the Watchmen/ Sentinels";  , lit.

Between the 1948 Arab–Israeli War and the Six-Day War in 1967, the peak of Mount Scopus with the Hebrew University campus and Hadassah Hospital was a UN-protected Israeli exclave within Jordanian-administered territory. Today, Mount Scopus lies within the municipal boundaries of the city of Jerusalem.

Name and identification
The ridge of mountains east of ancient as well as modern Jerusalem offers the best views of the city, which it dominates. Since the main part of the ridge bears the name Mount of Olives, the name "lookout" was reserved for this peak to the northeast of the ancient city. Its name in many languages (Hebrew, Arabic, Greek and Latin) means "lookout." Scopus is a Latinisation of the Greek word for "watcher", skopos, the same as in "telescope" (tele- meaning far and skopos  – watcher). Adding to the multi-layered meaning of the name, it is also said that in times in which the city's Roman or Byzantine authorities prohibited Jews from entering Jerusalem, they used to come and look at their former capital from this vantage point.

The Hebrew name, Har HaTzofim, "Lookout Mountain", is not mentioned in the Hebrew Bible. It first appears in the form of the Greek "ὁ Σκοπός" (skopós) in the works of Josephus (The Jewish War 2.528; 5.67, 106, first century CE) in connection to Alexander the Great and the 70 CE Roman siege. The Mishnah (third century CE) mentions "Tzofim" in relation to Jerusalem, but it is not at all certain that it means a particular location or rather any point from which the Temple can be seen.

The ancient name Har Hatzofim or Mount Scopus has been affixed to this particular mountain and its peak in the 20th century without the certainty that it corresponds precisely to what Josephus had referred to as Mount Scopus (see Modern era section).

History

Antiquity
Overlooking Jerusalem, Mount Scopus has been strategically important as a base from which to attack the city since antiquity. The 12th Roman Legion camped there in 66. In 70, at the conclusion of the same war that led to the destruction of the Jewish Temple, Mount Scopus was used as a base to carry out the final siege of the city by the same 12th Legion, plus the 15th and 5th Legions, while the 10th Legion was positioned on the continuation of the same ridge, known as the Mount of Olives. The Crusaders used it as a base in 1099.

Modern era

The exact location of the mountain known in the ancient sources as Mount Scopus is not known. It is described as being in the north-eastern part of the ridge that prominently includes the Mount of Olives, which dominates Jerusalem from the east. As the Zionist organisations decided to build a new Jewish institution of higher learning in Jerusalem, which eventually became the Hebrew University, they decided that it was unwise to try and ask for donations for a project designed to be built on the Mount of Olives, a location with many Christian connotations. The site chosen for the university did correspond approximately to the description of the ancient Mount Scopus, and so it was decided to name that particular peak Mount Scopus. The name became widely used and few Jerusalemites would nowadays know about this rebranding story of an old name. However, the ancient Mount Scopus cannot be far from the modern one. In 1948, as the British began letting go of their security responsibilities, the Jewish enclave on Mount Scopus became increasingly cut off from the main sections of Jewish Jerusalem. Arab sniper fire on vehicles moving along the access route became a regular occurrence, and road mines were laid. When food and supplies at the hospital begun to dwindle, a large convoy carrying doctors and supplies set out for the besieged hospital, leading to an attack that became known as the Hadassah medical convoy massacre. Seventy-eight Jewish doctors, nurses, students, patients, faculty members and Haganah fighters, and one British soldier were killed in the attack. 

After the ceasefire agreement of November 30, 1948, which established the division of East and West Jerusalem, Israel controlled the western part of the city while Jordan controlled the east. Several demilitarized "no man's land" zones were established along the border, one of them Mount Scopus. Fortnightly convoys carrying supplies to the university and hospital located in the Israeli part of the demilitarized zone on Mount Scopus were periodically held up by Jordanian troops.

Article VIII of the 1949 Armistice Agreements signed by Israel and Jordan in April 1949 called for a resumption of "the normal functioning of the cultural and humanitarian institutions on Mount Scopus and free access thereto; free access to the Holy Places and cultural institutions and use of the cemetery on the Mount of Olives; resumption of operation of the Latrun pumping station; provision of electricity for the Old City; and resumption of operation of the railroad to Jerusalem." In January 1958, Francis Urrutia, a representative of the UN Secretary-General, tried to persuade Jordan to abide by Article VIII, but without success. In May 1958, Jordanian soldiers fired on Israeli patrols, killing a UN officer and four Israeli policemen. Ralph Bunche, assistant to UN Secretary-General Dag Hammarskjöld visited Jerusalem and Amman to find a solution, followed by Hammarskjöld himself, again unsuccessfully. The Mount Scopus Agreement signed on July 7, 1948, regulated the demilitarised zone around Mount Scopus and authorized the United Nations Truce Supervision Organization to settle disputes between the Israelis and Jordanians.

Two Jewish-owned plots in al-Issawiya, known as Gan Shlomit or Salomons Garden, were purchased by Mrs. V.F. Salomons in 1934 and sold to the Gan Shlomit Company, Ltd. in 1937. This land was surrounded by a fence, but clashes erupted when Arabs living on the other side of the fence sought to cultivate land, pick olives and carry out repairs on homes close to the fence. The Arabs were requested not to work closer than fifty metres from the fence unless prior permission was granted by the Israeli police. There were two versions of the demilitarization agreement: one was initialed by Franklyn M. Begley, a UN official; the local Jordanian commander; and the Israeli local commander; while the other was not initialed by the Israeli local commander. Having two versions of the map was the cause of many incidents within the Mount Scopus area.

Landmarks

Hebrew University of Jerusalem
Construction of the Mount Scopus campus of the Hebrew University began in 1918 on land purchased from the Gray Hill estate. The dedication ceremony was held in 1925 in the presence of many dignitaries. A design for the university campus by Sir Patrick Geddes positioned the university buildings on the slopes of the mount, below a domed, hexagonal Great Hall recalling the Star of David, as a counterpoint to the octagonal Dome of the Rock in the Old City. This plan was never implemented, but Geddes designed the university Library, today the Hebrew University Faculty of Law on Mount Scopus.

By 1947, the university was a solid research and teaching institution with humanities, science, medicine, education and agriculture departments (in Rehovot), a national library, a university press and an adult education center. The university had a student population of over 1,000 and 200 faculty members.

Bezalel Academy of Arts and Design
Bezalel Academy of Arts and Design is Israel's national school of art, founded in 1906 by Boris Schatz. It is named for the Biblical figure Bezalel, son of Uri, who was appointed by Moses to oversee the design and construction of the Tabernacle (Exodus 35:30).

Cave of Nicanor
The Cave of Nicanor is an ancient burial cave located on Mount Scopus in Jerusalem, Israel. Excavations in the cave discovered an ossuary referring to "Nicanor the door maker." He has been identified as Nicanor of Alexandria, who donated one of the gates of Herod's Temple. The cave is located in the Botanical gardens on the grounds of the National Botanical Garden (see below).

There was a plan to use the Cave of Nicanor as a national Pantheon of the Zionist movement, but due to circumstances (the area of Mount Scopus after receipt of Israel's independence was an enclave, surrounded by the West Bank territorial possessions of Jordan), this project was not implemented. Only two of the Zionist leaders – Leon Pinsker and Menachem Ussishkin – were interred inside one room of the ancient tomb. After 1948, the national cemetery was created on Mount Herzl, closer to the centre of West Jerusalem.

Hadassah Hospital (Mount Scopus)
In 1939, the Hadassah Women's Organization opened a teaching hospital on Mount Scopus in a building designed by architect Erich Mendelsohn. In 1948, when the Jordanians occupied East Jerusalem and blockaded the road to Mount Scopus, the hospital could no longer function. In 1960, after running clinics in various locations, the organization opened a medical center on the other side of the city, in Jerusalem's Ein Karem neighborhood.
On April 13, 1948, a civilian convoy bringing medical supplies and personnel to Hadassah Hospital on Mount Scopus was attacked by Arab forces. 78 Jews, mainly doctors and nurses, were killed in the ambush.

Hecht Synagogue, Hebrew University
The Hecht Synagogue, a large noticeable building on the south-west corner of the campus, was erected by the family of Mayer Jacob "Chic" Hecht (1928–2006),  a Republican United States Senator from Nevada and U.S. Ambassador to the Bahamas. It is noted for the unique arrangement of the Torah ark and the panoramic view of the Old City from a huge window.

National Botanical Garden of Israel
The National Botanic Garden of Israel, also called the Land of Israel Botanic Garden, was founded on the grounds of the Hebrew University on Mount Scopus by botanist Alexander Eig in 1931. This garden contains one of the largest collections of Israeli uncultivated plants. This was the first home of Jerusalem's Biblical Zoo. A cave in the garden has been identified as the Tomb of Nicanor (see above).

Jerusalem British War Cemetery
The British cemetery in Jerusalem (Jerusalem War Cemetery) is a military cemetery for fallen soldiers of the British Empire, later known as the British Commonwealth of Nations, in World War I in Palestine. The cemetery is located on the neck of land on the north end of the Mount of Olives and west of Mount Scopus.

2515 were buried in the cemetery fallen soldiers, of 2449 war dead, including 2218 British casualties. A total 100 fallen soldiers are unidentified.

A memorial was placed in the cemetery to 3300 service personnel killed in operations in Palestine and Egypt who have no known grave. In all, commemorated in this cemetery are 5815 service personnel of World War I. No casualties buried in the cemetery died after the war.

Kiryat Menachem Begin
Kiryat Menachem Begin, named after former Israeli Prime Minister Menachem Begin and also known as Kiryat HaMemshala, is a complex of government buildings in East Jerusalem located between Sheikh Jarrah in the north, adjacent to Mount Scopus in the east and Ammunition Hill in the west. It serves as home to several government offices, along with the main government complex in Givat Ram. It also includes the National Headquarters of the Israel Police.

Tabachnik Garden
Tabachnik Garden is a National Park located on the southern slopes of Mount Scopus, next to the Hebrew University. The park preserves some Jewish burial caves from the Second Temple period and it also contains two smaller cemeteries, the Bentwich Cemetery and one of the cemeteries of the American Colony. Inside the park there are two lookouts, one facing eastward towards the Dead Sea and the Judean Desert, the other westward towards the Temple Mount.

Jerusalem American Colony Cemetery
The American Colony Cemetery on Mount Scopus is the main cemetery of Jerusalem's American Colony, located next to the Hebrew University in the Tabachnik Garden. Among those buried there are Anna Spafford and Jacob Spafford (1864–1932), born in Ramallah as Jacob Eliahu into a Turkish Jewish family, adoptive son of Horatio and Anna Spafford and discoverer of the Siloam inscription.

Bentwich Cemetery
A small cemetery, dedicated to Herbert Bentwich and his family, is located beside the American Colony Cemetery in Tabachnik Garden.

Ammunition Hill
Ammunition Hill was a fortified Jordanian military post in the north-west side of Mount Scopus in Jerusalem that was in the northern part of Jordanian East Jerusalem. It was the site of one of the fiercest battles of the Six-Day War.

Gallery

References

External links

Mount Scopus – The Hebrew University
Mount Scopus – The Brigham Young University
Jerusalem Photos Portal – Mount Scopus

 
Geography of Jerusalem
Hills of Israel
Former exclaves
Landforms of Jerusalem District
East Jerusalem